Florian Roșu (born 20 April 1993) is a Romanian rugby union player. He plays as a Lock or as a flanker for Romanian SuperLiga club Știința Baia Mare.

Club career
Florian Roșu started playing for SuperLiga in 2012, at the age of 19 but moved to Dinamo București after one seasons in Baia Mare where he would rejoin his first professional club two years later in 2015. However, upon a few seasons, Roșu became a non-negotiable starter for Baia Mare and at times, the captain of the side.

International career
Roșu was selected for the Oaks for their Summer Tests in 2021, making his international debut on the 2nd of July in a test match against Los Pumas.

References

External links

1993 births
Living people
Romanian rugby union players
Romania international rugby union players
Rugby union flankers